The Concubine was a deathcore band from Tabernacle Township, New Jersey. Formed in 2003, they have since toured with Knife the Glitter, Veil of Maya, Left to Vanish and other similar bands, and have been hailed on metal blogs as an up-and-coming metal band.

The group made their recording debut with a 2004 EP, Maestro, If You Will. Their first full-length album, Abaddon, received mixed reviews.

According to the band's Myspace, The Concubine has disbanded, citing "other interests and careers" as the reason for the break-up.

References

External links
 The Concubine's Official Site
 The Concubine's Purevolume
 The Concubine's Official Myspace

Heavy metal musical groups from New Jersey
American deathcore musical groups
People from Tabernacle Township, New Jersey